The Texas Tomorrow Fund is a prepaid college investment program operating in Texas.

There are two plans:

The Texas Guaranteed Tuition Plan
The Texas College Savings Plan (formerly the Tomorrow's College Investment Plan).

The former is a constitutionally guaranteed trust fund backed by the State of Texas, whereas the latter is an investment plan managed by NorthStar Financial Services Group, LLC. The Texas College Savings Plan is not backed directly by the state; it serves as an investment plan for tuition money, as opposed to a prepaid fund.

In 2003 a Texas law was introduced to allow public institutions of higher education to set their own tuition and fees, rather than being forced to charge what the State thought was appropriate. The State's guaranteed tuition plan was in jeopardy, for the State could not effectively predict how expensive tuition was going to be a decade from now and, consequently, could not accurately peg charges for applicants. New enrollment in the Texas Guaranteed Tuition Plan was then closed.

As an example of how much non-regulated tuition has cost the Texas Tomorrow Fund, a family purchasing 120 credit hours for a child's entrance to a public college in 2004 paid a total of $10,000 — about $83 per credit hour.  As of fall 2016, the payout, due to rising tuition costs, was approximately $300 per credit hour.

Texas Tomorrow Fund in the Texas Constitution 

Located in Article 7, Section 19 of the Texas Constitution, the Texas Tomorrow Fund was added November 4, 1997, for the purpose of higher education in Texas.

The Section is as follows,

"(a) The Texas tomorrow fund is created as a trust fund dedicated to the prepayment of tuition and fees for higher education as provided by the general laws of this state for the prepaid higher education tuition program. The assets of the fund are held in trust for the benefit of participants and beneficiaries and may not be diverted.  The state shall hold the assets of the fund for the exclusive purposes of providing benefits to participants and beneficiaries and defraying reasonable expenses of administering the program. 

(b) Financing of benefits must be based on sound actuarial principles. The amount contributed by a person participating in the prepaid higher education program shall be as provided by the general laws of this state, but may not be less than the amount anticipated for tuition and required fees based on sound actuarial principles.  If in any fiscal year there is not enough money in the Texas tomorrow fund to pay the tuition and required fees of an institution of higher education in which a beneficiary enrolls or the appropriate portion of the tuition and required fees of a private or independent institution of higher education in which a beneficiary enrolls as provided by a prepaid tuition contract, there is appropriated out of the first money coming into the state treasury in each fiscal year not otherwise appropriated by the constitution the amount that is sufficient to pay the applicable amount of tuition and required fees of the institution.

(c) Assets of the fund may be invested by an entity designated by general law in securities considered prudent investments. Investments shall be made in the exercise of judgment and care under the circumstances that a person of ordinary prudence, discretion, and intelligence exercises in the management of the person's affairs, not for speculation, but for the permanent disposition of funds, considering the probable income from the disposition as well as the probable safety of capital.

(d) The state comptroller of public accounts shall take the actions necessary to implement this section.

(e) To the extent this section conflicts with any other provision of this constitution, this section controls."

Fund in debt 
Due to rising costs after state tuition was deregulated in 2003, the program stopped accepting new participants.

A February 19, 2007 article in the Daily Texan reported that the Texas Tomorrow Fund program is in debt due to rising tuition. By 2029 the program could be in debt for as much as $3.3 billion, running completely out of money by 2018, due to the difference in tuition rates between the state's projections and the actual cost of tuition at major public universities. (UT Austin tuition was $7,630 per year in 2007; the state had projected $5,332.) This gap is currently paid by the University out of tuition from non-Tomorrow Fund students and, as more students enroll using the Fund, universities must raise tuition to balance out the lack of income from Tomorrow Fund students. The International Office handles Texas Tomorrow Funds/Texas Guaranteed Tuition Plan requests only for students attending study abroad programs where they are not paying UT tuition rates

Restarting the program 
An article May 18, 2007 in the Dallas Morning News reported that the Texas Tomorrow Fund will be reopened for new enrollment under a new name:  The Texas Tuition Promise Fund launched September 10, 2008.

Under this program there are three categories from which parents will be able to buy semester hours in units (a unit represents 1% of a year's tuition, based on two semesters of 15 credit-hours each), with prices based on the type of college the student plans to attend. The most expensive level is flagship public universities, followed by other four-year public institutions, followed by two-year community colleges. If the student enrolls in a college more expensive than the weighted average for their level of plan, they will have to pay the difference (either with extra units or with money from other sources), ensuring that this program should not experience the shortfall problems of the previous program.

Substantial program changes 
On August 24, 2009 the Texas Prepaid Higher Education Tuition Board published a substantial change to the contract terms of the program. Previously, when contracts were canceled, participants were refunded the current value of tuition and fees at the time of cancellation. As of November 1, 2009 participants will be refunded only the amount of their contributions minus any applicable account fees.

On September 24, 2009, the Tuition Board published an amendment to the change a month earlier. The deadline for refunds was extended until November 30, 2009.  Participants cancel matured contracts will receive a refund based upon their contributions plus earnings, minus applicable fees. Participants who cancel unmatured contracts will receive the lump sum actuarial value of the contract, minus fees.

On November 6, 2009, the Tuition Board published a partial policy reversal to the previous amendment, pending an approval vote by the Board on December 23, 2009. Those who have withdrawn funds based upon the previous rule change in September may rescind their cancellation by December 31, 2009.  Those who choose to opt out of the plan (and receive either actual tuition-based earnings or lump sum actuarial value) may do so through January 31, 2010.

See also 
Guaranteed Education Tuition Program, a similar program in Washington state

References

External links 
 Constitutional basis for Texas Tomorrow Fund
 Official Texas Tomorrow Fund website
 Official Texas Tuition Promise Fund website
 February 19, 2007 Daily Texan article: Tomorrow Fund in up to $3.3 billion hole
 May 18, 2007 Dallas Morning News article: Senate OKs scaled-down Texas Tomorrow Fund
 September 10, 2008 press release: Texas Comptroller Susan Combs Introduces the Texas Tuition Promise Fund For Texas Families to Achieve College Savings Goals

Education in Texas
Education finance in the United States